Cats and Peachtopia is a 2018 Chinese animated fantasy film directed and written by Gary Wang, produced by Light Chaser Animation Studios. It was originally released in China on April 5, 2018.

Cast 
 Dermot Mulroney as Blanket
 Nicole Tompkins as Cape
 Nick Guerra as Biggie
 Vladimir Caamaño as Male Antelope
 Jonathan Katz as Male Gibbon
 Brittany Curran as Female Goat

Sequel

Reception 
The film earned $1,658,338 on its opening weekend and finished with a total gross of $3,424,207.

References

External links 

 
 

2018 films